The palpebral bone is a small dermal bone found in the region of the eye socket in a variety of animals, including crocodilians and ornithischian dinosaurs. It is also known as the adlacrimal or supraorbital, although the latter term may not be confused with the supraorbital in osteichthyan fishes. In ornithischians, the palpebral can form a prong that projects from the front upper corner of the orbit. It is large in heterodontosaurids, basal ornithopods such as Thescelosaurus (as Bugenasaura) and Dryosaurus, and basal ceratopsians such as Archaeoceratops; in these animals, the prong is elongate and would have stuck out and over the eye like a bony eyebrow. As paleoartist Gregory S. Paul has noted, elongate palpebrals would have given their owners fierce-looking "eagle eyes". In such cases, the expanded palpebral may have functioned to shade the eye.

References

Vertebrate anatomy
Dinosaur anatomy
Eye anatomy
Skull